Kalagi is a town located in the Western Division of the Gambia.

According to a 2013 estimate around 2825 inhabitants live there. The result of the last published census of 2013 2609.

Populated places in the Gambia